Xiaoqing Wen from the Kyushu Institute of Technology, Iizuka, Fukuoka, Japan was named Fellow of the Institute of Electrical and Electronics Engineers (IEEE) in 2012 for contributions to testing of integrated circuits.

References

External links
 https://ieeexplore.ieee.org/author/37416148800

Fellow Members of the IEEE
Living people
Year of birth missing (living people)
Place of birth missing (living people)